NGC 4294 is a barred spiral galaxy with flocculent spiral arms located about 55 million light-years away in the constellation Virgo. The galaxy was discovered by astronomer William Herschel on March 15, 1784 and is a member of the Virgo Cluster.

NGC 4294 appears to be undergoing ram-pressure stripping edge-on.

Physical characteristics
NGC 4294 hosts many H II regions.

Interaction with NGC 4299
NGC 4294 appears to be in a pair with NGC 4299 and may be possibly tidally interacting.

Effects of a tidal interaction on NGC 4294 are evident as the galaxy has a disturbed optical and HI morphology, a high global star formation rate, and has an observed asymmetry in polarized radio continuum emission.

HI tail
Chung et al. identified that NGC 4294 has a one sided  tail of neutral atomic hydrogen (HI). The tail points to the southwest  and appears to be a result of ram-pressure. The tail has no optical counterpart and is oriented parallel to the HI tail found in NGC 4299.

As the tail has no optical counterpart, this makes the probability of the tail being caused by tidal interaction low. This means that the scenario of the tail originating from a tidal interaction cannot be ruled out entirely.

Black Hole
NGC 4294 may harbor an intermediate-mass black hole with an estimated mass ranging from 3,000 (3*10^3) to 20,000 (2*10^4) solar masses.

References

External links 

4294
7407
39925
+02-32-009
J122117.82+113037.6
Virgo (constellation)
Astronomical objects discovered in 1784
Barred spiral galaxies
Flocculent spiral galaxies
Virgo Cluster
Interacting galaxies
Discoveries by William Herschel